Martin Rennie may refer to:

Martin Rennie (football manager) (born 1975), Scottish football manager
Martin Rennie (footballer) (born 1994), Scottish footballer